Rhos-on-Sea Golf Club (Welsh: Clwb Golff Llandrillo-yn-Rhos) is a golf club based just outside Rhos-on-Sea at Conwy County Borough, Wales. It is an 18-hole course on parkland. This club has a "Pay and Play" policy. More details at http://www.rhosgolf.co.uk

The course was redesigned in 1934 by Simpson & Co. Golf Architects Ltd, of Liphook.

Notes

Rhos-on-Sea
Golf clubs and courses in Wales
Golf club